In geometry, a catenoid is a type of surface, arising by rotating a catenary curve about an axis (a surface of revolution). It is a minimal surface, meaning that it occupies the least area when bounded by a closed space. It was formally described in 1744 by the mathematician Leonhard Euler.

Soap film attached to twin circular rings will take the shape of a catenoid. Because they are members of the same associate family of surfaces, a catenoid can be bent into a portion of a helicoid, and vice versa.

Geometry
The catenoid was the first non-trivial minimal surface in 3-dimensional Euclidean space to be discovered apart from the plane. The catenoid is obtained by rotating a catenary about its directrix. It was found and proved to be minimal by Leonhard Euler in 1744.

Early work on the subject was published also by Jean Baptiste Meusnier. There are only two minimal surfaces of revolution (surfaces of revolution which are also minimal surfaces): the plane and the catenoid.

The catenoid may be defined by the following parametric equations:

In cylindrical coordinates:

where  is a real constant.

A physical model of a catenoid can be formed by dipping two circular rings into a soap solution and slowly drawing the circles apart.

The catenoid may be also defined approximately by the Stretched grid method as a facet 3D model.

Helicoid transformation 

Because they are members of the same associate family of surfaces, one can bend a catenoid into a portion of a helicoid without stretching.  In other words, one can make a (mostly) continuous and isometric deformation of a catenoid to a portion of the helicoid such that every member of the deformation family is minimal (having a mean curvature of zero).  A parametrization of such a deformation is given by the system

  corresponds to a right-handed helicoid, 
  corresponds to a catenoid, and
  corresponds to a left-handed helicoid.

References

Further reading

External links
 
 Catenoid - WebGL model
 Euler's text describing the catenoid at Carnegie Mellon University
Calculating the surface area of a Catenoid

Geometry
Minimal surfaces

de:Minimalfläche#Das Katenoid